is Meisa Kuroki's first single, released on July 22, 2009. It was being used in Kirin's Cola Shock commercial, starring Kuroki herself.

Track list

Charts

Oricon Sales Charts

References

2009 singles
Japanese-language songs
Meisa Kuroki songs
2009 songs